Dibromoethane can refer to either of two isomeric organobromides with the molecular formula C2H4Br2:

 1,1-Dibromoethane (ethylidene dibromide)
 1,2-Dibromoethane (ethylene dibromide)

See also
 Dibromoethene